Smetana is an unincorporated community in Brazos County, in the U.S. state of Texas. According to the Handbook of Texas, the community had a population of 80 in 2000. It is located within the Bryan-College Station metropolitan area.

History
The area in what is known as Smetana today was first settled by Bohemian families in the early 1880s. A small store was in operation in 1885. A post office was established at Smetana in 1896 and remained in operation until 1906. There were four businesses, several scattered homes, and two separate cemeteries for Black and White people in 1941. Its population was 50 from the 1930s to the 1940s, shrank to 20 in 1962, but then grew to 80 in 1990 and remained there through 2000. This was due to the growth of the Bryan-College Station area and Texas A&M University. There were three businesses, two cemeteries, and two community centers in Smetana in 1980 and by the end of that decade, it had two restaurants and a grocery store.

Geography

Education
Smetana had its own school in 1885 and gained another one in 1941. The Texas A&M Research and Extension Center, also known as the Old Bryan Army Airfield, is located one mile west of Smetana. Today, the community is served by the Bryan Independent School District.

References

Unincorporated communities in Brazos County, Texas
Unincorporated communities in Texas